Anthony Richard Perkins (born March 20, 1963) is an American politician and evangelical lobbyist. He is president of the Family Research Council, a Christian conservative policy and lobbying organization based in Washington, D.C. Perkins, an ordained Southern Baptist pastor, was previously a police officer and television reporter, served two terms as a Republican member of the Louisiana House of Representatives and unsuccessfully ran for the U.S. Senate in 2002. On May 14, 2018, he was appointed to the United States Commission on International Religious Freedom.

Early life and career 
Perkins was born and raised in the northern Oklahoma city of Cleveland and graduated in 1981 from Cleveland High School. He received his Bachelor of Science degree from Liberty University. He later earned a Master of Public Administration degree from Louisiana State University in Baton Rouge. After college, Perkins entered the United States Marine Corps. Following his tour of duty, he became a reserve deputy with the East Baton Rouge Parish Sheriff's Office and also worked with the U.S. State Department's Anti-Terrorism Assistance Program instructing hostage negotiation and bomb disposal to hundreds of police officers from around the world.

After the federal contract for the anti-terrorism program ended, Perkins left law enforcement to work for KBTR, the Baton Rouge TV station owned by then-State Representative Woody Jenkins. At KBTR, Perkins opened a news division.

Political career

Louisiana House of Representatives 
Perkins won an open seat in the Louisiana House representing District 64 (the eastern Baton Rouge suburbs, including part of Livingston Parish) when he defeated Democrat Herman L. Milton of Baker 63% to 37% in the nonpartisan blanket primary held on October 21, 1995. He was elected on a conservative platform of strong families and limited government. Four years later, he was reelected without opposition. He retired from the legislature in 2004, fulfilling a promise to serve no more than two terms.

While in office, Perkins authored legislation to require Louisiana public schools to install Internet filtering software, to provide daily silent prayer, and to prevent what he termed "censorship of America's Christian heritage". Perkins also authored the nation's first covenant marriage law, a voluntary type of marriage that permits divorce only in cases of physical abuse, abandonment, adultery, imprisonment or after two years of separation.

Perkins opposed casino gambling in Louisiana, calling a 1996 plan to restrict the location of gambling riverboats to one side of the river, "putting lipstick on a hog". It doesn't make the bill any better, it just looks a little better." Perkins was described as "staunchly anti-abortion" by Public Broadcasting Service which also credited him with working on law and order and economic development issues while in the state house. Perkins was instrumental in increasing state regulation of Louisiana abortion clinics; he sponsored a law to require state licensing and sanitary inspections.

2002 U.S. Senate election 
Perkins ran for the United States Senate in 2002 as a social and religious conservative Republican. Louisiana's then-Governor, Murphy J. Foster Jr., and the National Republican Senatorial Committee backed other candidates. Perkins finished in fourth place in the nonpartisan blanket primary with just under 10% of the vote. The Democratic incumbent, Mary Landrieu, was re-elected in the general election against another Republican, Suzanne Haik Terrell.

USCIRF appointment 
On May 14, 2018, he was appointed as one of nine commissioners to the United States Commission on International Religious Freedom (USCIRF). His appointment was opposed by the Hindu American Foundation for his track record of "hateful stances against non-Christians."

On June 17, 2019, the USCIRF elected Perkins as chair for the commission. On June 16, 2020, he became the USCIRF vice chair.

Political future 
Perkins was floated as a potential Republican candidate for the U.S. Senate against Mary Landrieu in the 2014 election. Despite strongly criticising Bill Cassidy, the main Republican challenger to Landrieu, as "pretty weak on the issues", Perkins said in an interview in January 2014 that he would not run against Landrieu. He did however express interest in running for David Vitter's U.S. Senate Seat, should Vitter be elected Governor of Louisiana in 2015. Vitter lost the election and announced he would not run for re-election to the Senate, but Perkins declined to run in the 2016 election and endorsed John Fleming for the seat.

Activism

Louisiana Family Forum 
According to the Baptist Press, Perkins' "concern about the influence of the homosexual movement" led to his involvement in the 1998 founding of the Louisiana Family Forum, a conservative, faith-oriented, anti-abortion, and non-profit group.

Family Research Council 

In September 2003, Perkins withdrew from the race for Louisiana state insurance commissioner to become the president of the conservative Christian Family Research Council (FRC). He replaced Ken Connor. In addition to his duties as president of the FRC, Perkins hosts a radio program, Washington Watch with Tony Perkins.

Perkins was involved in the 2005 controversy over the disconnection of life support for Terri Schiavo, a woman who had been in a "persistent vegetative state" for a number of years. After a final court order permitted Schiavo's husband to remove her feeding tube and thereby cause her to die, Perkins stated, "we should remember that her death is a symptom of a greater problem: that the courts no longer respect human life."

In October 2008, Perkins called the passage of California Proposition 8 (which prohibited same sex marriage in the state) "more important than the presidential election", adding that the United States has survived despite picking bad presidents in the past but "we will not survive if we lose the institution of marriage."

In 2010, Perkins dismissed the SPLC hate group designation as a political attack on the FRC by a "liberal organization" and as part of "the left's smear campaign of conservatives".

Political positions

Candidates 
In 2015, Perkins affirmed the debate over Obama's birth certificate as "legitimate", remarking that it "makes sense" to conclude that Obama was a Muslim. That year, a survey reported that "54 percent of GOP voters thought Obama was a Muslim".

In 2016, Perkins endorsed Ted Cruz for the Republican presidential nomination.

In 2017, some supporters of a political candidate, Wesley Goodman, who was alleged to have committed a sexual assault in 2015, complained that Perkins did not reveal information to the public about Goodman's actions.

In 2018, Perkins was willing to overlook Donald Trump's past, stating that President Trump should be given a "Mulligan". Perkins opined that Trump was "providing the leadership we need at this time, in our country and in our culture."

Israel 
In 2014, Perkins released an editorial explaining why he supports Israel.

Judicial nominees 
In 2005, Perkins opposed the filibustering of certain right-leaning federal judicial nominees by U.S. Senate Democrats, arguing that the Democrats were waging a "campaign against orthodox religious views", and that the judicial nominees were being persecuted for their Christian faith. He became one of the organizers and hosts of Justice Sunday, a series of events that sought to mobilize the evangelical Christian base in support of the nominees.

LGBT issues 
In 2010, Perkins opposed the overturning of the "Don't ask, don't tell" law that prohibited people who were openly gay or lesbian from serving in the U.S. military. Perkins argued that the repeal would, among other things, infringe on the religious liberty of military chaplains and other service members holding orthodox Christian views.

In 2006, Perkins urged Congress to pass the Federal Marriage Amendment to the U.S. Constitution which would define marriage in the United States as the union between one man and one woman. He explained his reasoning in a 2006 Human Events column:

The definition... is rooted in the order of nature itself. It promotes the continuation of the human race and the cooperation of a mother and a father in raising the children they produce. This union can only be protected through amending the United States Constitution. If it's not, activists will continue using the courts to sell a five-legged dog.

Perkins believes natural disasters are divine punishments for homosexuality. His own home was destroyed in the 2016 Louisiana floods, which he described as "a flood of near-biblical proportions". News outlets noted the irony.

Minimum wage 
Perkins opposes any increases in the minimum wage, which he stated in a book that he co-authored with Harry R. Jackson, Jr. in 2008.  Jackson stated that the minimum wage is rooted in racism.

Religion 
In June 2019, Perkins advocated for the "fundamental human right of religious freedom" for non-Christians.

He criticized the persecution of Uyghurs in China and religious minorities in Iran.

In September 2010, Perkins claimed that "the ultimate evil has been committed" when Muslims interpret the Quran in its literal context, that Islam "tears at the fabric of democracy," and that world history classes dishonestly portray Islam in a positive light by providing an "airbrushed" portrait of the religion itself.

In 2007, Perkins opposed the first-ever Hindu prayer before the United States Senate, saying, "There is no historic connection between America and the polytheistic creed of the Hindu faith." He also opposed a US Marines yoga and meditation program for PTSD prevention, characterizing the Hindu and Buddhist practices as "goofy".

Second Amendment 
Perkins is a self-described "ardent supporter of the Second Amendment" who is "willing to talk about laws regarding the ownership and use of guns by those who should not have them."

2020 election results 

Perkins signed a December 10, 2020, letter from the Conservative Action Project asking state legislatures in the battleground states of Pennsylvania, Arizona, Georgia, Wisconsin, Nevada, and Michigan to exercise their plenary power under the Constitution to overturn Joe Biden's victory by appointing pro-Trump slates of electors to the Electoral College.

Controversies 
On May 17, 2001, Perkins gave a speech to the Louisiana chapter of the Council of Conservative Citizens, a white supremacist group that has described black people as a "retrograde species of humanity". Perkins said he did not know the group's ideology at the time. In an April 26, 2005, article in The Nation, Max Blumenthal reported that while managing the unsuccessful U. S. Senate campaign of Woody Jenkins in 1996, Perkins "paid former Ku Klux Klan Grand Wizard David Duke $82,500 for his mailing list." Perkins denied knowing about the purchase. A document authorizing the payment was reported to contain Perkins' signature. The incident resurfaced in the local press in 2002, during Perkins' unsuccessful Senate run.

Personal life 
Perkins is married to Lawana Perkins (née Lee), with whom he has five children. He also adopted 16-year-old Boko Haram-held captive, Nigerian Leah Sharibu.

He has been affiliated with the National Rifle Association, the American Legion, the Christian Coalition, and the Baton Rouge Rescue Mission. Perkins served as president of the Council for National Policy.

Perkins' family was affected by the 2016 Louisiana floods, and had to evacuate their Louisiana home by canoe.

References

External links 

 Tony Perkins on Gab
 Louisiana Family Forum's website
 The Family Research Council's Tony Perkins is a rising star in a crowded universe of evangelical Christian leaders (Bill Berkowitz, on mediatransparency.com, June 17, 2005)
 People for the American Way: Family Research Council
 Perkins, Tony. "Congress Fails Americans on Marriage ."
 

|-

1963 births
Living people
20th-century Baptists
21st-century Baptists
American Christian religious leaders
American Christian Zionists
American police officers
American television reporters and correspondents
American anti-same-sex-marriage activists
Baptists from Louisiana
Baptists from Oklahoma
Christian fundamentalists
American conspiracy theorists
American critics of Islam
American gun rights activists
Human Events people
Journalists from Louisiana
Liberty University alumni
Louisiana State University alumni
Republican Party members of the Louisiana House of Representatives
Far-right politicians in the United States
People from Cleveland, Oklahoma
Politicians from Baton Rouge, Louisiana
Southern Baptists
United States Marines
Discrimination against LGBT people in the United States